Kealy is a surname. Notable people with the surname include:

Andrew P. Kealy (1861–1917), American politician
Brendan Kealy (born 1986), Irish Gaelic footballer
David Kealy (born 1965), Irish footballer
Emma Kealy (born 1977), Australian politician
John W. Kealy (1902–1970), New Zealand politician and lawyer
Mike Kealy (1945–1979), British Army officer serving in the Special Air Service
Thomas J. Kealy (1927–2012), American chemist, co-discoverer of ferrocene
Alex Kealy, Stand-up comedian